The 2018–19 Panathinaikos season is the club's 60th consecutive season in Super League Greece. They are also competing in the Greek Cup.

Players

Transfers

In

Summer

Out

Summer

Competitions

Super League Greece

League table

Matches

Greek Cup

Group C

Round of 16

References

External links 

Panathinaikos F.C. seasons
Panathinaikos